Alex Ribeiro Garcia, commonly known as either Alex Garcia, or simply as Alex (born 4 March 1980) is a Brazilian professional basketball player. He also represented the senior Brazilian national team. He is a 6'2" (1.88 m) 225 lb. (102 kg) shooting guard-small forward.

Professional career
Garcia has served two stints in the National Basketball Association as a member of the San Antonio Spurs (2003–04) and New Orleans Hornets (2004–05). He holds NBA career averages of 4.7 points per game and 1.8 assists per game. Garcia was promptly waived by the hornets after suffering an anterior cruciate ligament injury vs. the Washington Wizards on December 12, 2004.

Garcia has also played with UniCEUB/BRB and several other clubs of the top-tier level Brazilian League.

National team career
Garcia has been a member of the senior men's Brazilian national basketball team. With Brazil, he has played at the following major tournaments: the 2002 FIBA World Cup, the 2003 FIBA AmeriCup, the 2005 FIBA AmeriCup, the 2006 FIBA World Cup, the 2007 FIBA AmeriCup, the 2009 FIBA AmeriCup, the 2010 FIBA World Cup, the 2011 FIBA AmeriCup, the 2012 Summer Olympics, the 2013 FIBA AmeriCup, the 2014 FIBA World Cup, and the 2016 Summer Olympics.

Awards and accomplishments

Titles
 2× FIBA Americas League Champion: (2009, 2015)
 2× FIBA South American League Champion: (2010, 2014)
 6× Brazilian Championship Champion: (2003, 2007, 2010, 2011, 2012, 2017)

Individual awards
 2× FIBA Americas League Grand Finals MVP: (2009, 2015)
 7× All-Brazilian League Team: (2009, 2010, 2011, 2012, 2015, 2016, 2017)
 8× Brazilian League Defender of the Year: (2009, 2010, 2011, 2012, 2013, 2014, 2015, 2016)
 FIBA South American League MVP: (2014)
 Brazilian League MVP: (2015)
 Brazilian League Finals MVP: (2017)

Career statistics

Regular seasons

Playoffs

References

External links
 
 Basketball-Reference.com Profile
 FIBA Profile
 Euroleague.net Profile
 Brazilian League Profile 
 LatinBasket.com Profile

1980 births
Living people
Associação Bauru Basketball players
Basketball players at the 2003 Pan American Games
Basketball players at the 2007 Pan American Games
Basketball players at the 2012 Summer Olympics
Basketball players at the 2016 Summer Olympics
Brazilian expatriate basketball people in the United States
Brazilian expatriate sportspeople in Israel
Brazilian men's basketball players
Esporte Clube Pinheiros basketball players
Expatriate basketball people in Israel
Israeli Basketball Premier League players
Maccabi Tel Aviv B.C. players
National Basketball Association players from Brazil
New Orleans Hornets players
Novo Basquete Brasil players
Olympic basketball players of Brazil
Pan American Games gold medalists for Brazil
Pan American Games medalists in basketball
People from Orlândia
San Antonio Spurs players
Shooting guards
Small forwards
Undrafted National Basketball Association players
UniCEUB/BRB players
2014 FIBA Basketball World Cup players
2010 FIBA World Championship players
2006 FIBA World Championship players
2002 FIBA World Championship players
2019 FIBA Basketball World Cup players
Medalists at the 2003 Pan American Games
Medalists at the 2007 Pan American Games
Sportspeople from São Paulo (state)